The St. Louis, Peoria and Northern Railroad Depot is a historic railroad station located at 1408 Broadway Street in Pekin, Illinois. The station was built in 1898 when the St. Louis, Peoria and Northern Railway built a line into Pekin; the railroad had formed only two years earlier as an amalgamation of ten other railroad companies. The new railroad provided direct passenger routes to Springfield, Illinois and St. Louis, Missouri and opened up better options for shipping freight north through Peoria. The depot became part of the Chicago & Alton Railroad in 1900 when it purchased the St. L. P. & N. line from Peoria to Springfield. The station served both passenger and freight traffic until passenger service ended in the 1930s; the railroad also served as an important part of Pekin's economy, both by employing residents and stimulating local industry. The station is one of the only historic rail-related buildings remaining in Pekin.

The station was added to the National Register of Historic Places on December 6, 2004.

References

External links

Railway stations on the National Register of Historic Places in Illinois
Railway stations in the United States opened in 1898
Victorian architecture in Illinois
National Register of Historic Places in Tazewell County, Illinois
Pekin
Pekin, Illinois
Transportation buildings and structures in Tazewell County, Illinois
Former railway stations in Illinois